Takmak, Eşme is a town in Uşak Province Western Turkey, located at 38 ° 26'55 "N 28 ° 58'37" E . The village is famous for its rugs.  But nowadays rug production is reduced.

Takmak is 6 km from the town of Eşme. It has a continental climate transitioning to a Mediterranean climate and there was a Greek Speaking population in the town until 1922.

Population
 2007   588  
 2000   672  
 1990   785

Economy
Like most villages in the district the village economy of agriculture and animal husbandry is based mainly on tobacco farming, which has fallen dramatically in the past years.  Today's main agricultural activities;  wheat, barley, vetch, corn, and bean cultivation.  There are a limited number of families dealing vineyard.  Livestock breeding cattle in the foreground.  The milk produced is sold to various milk factory obtained a substantial income.

Archaeology
Ruins near Takmak, Eşme, have been tentatively identified as the remains of Mesotymolus a Byzantine era City and Bishopric.

References 

Populated places in Uşak Province
Towns in Turkey
Eşme District